Ahdi may refer to:

 Ahdi, Pakistan, a village in Punjab, Pakistan
 Ahdi of Baghdad, poet and bibliographer of the 16th century